"One Headlight" is a song by American rock band the Wallflowers. The song was written by lead singer Jakob Dylan, and produced by T-Bone Burnett. It was released in January 1997 as the second single from the band's second studio album, Bringing Down the Horse (1996). Dylan has said that the song is about "the death of ideas".

The song is notable for being the first single to reach No. 1 on all three of Billboard's rock airplay charts: the Modern Rock Tracks chart, the Mainstream Rock Songs chart and the Adult Alternative Songs chart. "One Headlight" also stayed at No. 1 in Canada for five weeks. In 2000, the song was listed at No. 58 on Rolling Stone and MTVs list of "100 Greatest Pop Songs of All Time".

Critical reception
"One Headlight" won two Grammy Awards at the 40th Annual Grammy Awards, Best Rock Song and Best Rock Performance by a Duo or Group. The song was performed live at the 1997 MTV Video Music Awards with Bruce Springsteen, where the music video was nominated four times, including for Viewer's Choice.

Music video
The music video was filmed in New York City in February 1997 and features the band performing.

Awards

Chart performance
Although the song did not chart on the US Billboard Hot 100 due to the chart rules at the time, it was a significant radio hit. It spent five weeks at No. 2 on the Billboard Hot 100 Airplay chart and a total of 70 weeks on the chart. In March 1997, it became the first song to top all three of Billboards rock airplay charts—the Modern Rock Tracks, Mainstream Rock Songs and Adult Alternative Songs charts. In Canada, the song reached No. 1 on the RPM Top Singles chart, staying there for five weeks and was also the third-most-successful song of the year. Outside North America, the song reached No. 14 in Australia and became a moderate hit in Germany and the United Kingdom.

Track listings
Australian CD single, UK 7-inch and CD single
 "One Headlight" (radio edit) – 4:38
 "6th Avenue Heartache" (acoustic) – 4:47
 "Angel on My Bike" (live) – 4:46

European CD single
 "One Headlight" (radio edit)
 "Angel on My Bike" (live)

Charts and certifications

Weekly charts

Year-end charts

All-time charts

Certifications

Release history

See also
 List of Billboard number-one alternative singles of 1997
 List of number-one singles of 1997 (Canada)

References

External links
 

1996 songs
1997 singles
Grammy Award for Best Rock Song
Interscope Records singles
RPM Top Singles number-one singles
Song recordings produced by T Bone Burnett
Songs written by Jakob Dylan
The Wallflowers songs
American alternative rock songs